The 2023 Akron mayoral election will be held on November 7, 2023, to elect the mayor of Akron, Ohio. Party primaries will be held on May 2. Incumbent Democratic mayor Dan Horrigan chose not to seek re-election to a third term in office.

Democratic primary

Candidates

Declared 
Mark Greer, former Akron Small Business Program Manager
Shammas Malik, city councilor
Keith Mills, teacher
Tara Mosley, city councilor and candidate for Lieutenant Governor of Ohio in 2018
Joshua Schaffer, cellphone store manager
Marco Sommerville, deputy mayor for intergovernmental affairs
Jeff Wilhite, Summit County councilor

Declined 
Dan Horrigan, incumbent mayor (endorsed Sommerville)

Fundraising 
Some candidates have not filed campaign finance disclosures. Those who have are listed below:

Results

Republican primary

Disqualified 
Jim Isabella, former WNIR talk show host

General election

Results

References

External links
Official campaign websites
 Shammas Malik (D) for Mayor
 Tara Mosley (D) for Mayor
 Joshua Schaffer (D) for Mayor
 Marco Sommerville (D) for Mayor

2023 Ohio elections
Akron